Pratapgarh is a constituency of the Uttar Pradesh Legislative Assembly covering the city of Pratapgarh in the Pratapgarh district of Uttar Pradesh, India.

Pratapgarh is one of five assembly constituencies in the Pratapgarh Lok Sabha constituency. Since 2008, this assembly constituency is numbered 248 amongst 403 constituencies.

Election results

2022

2019 Bypoll
2019 Pratapgarh assembly by election was won by Apna dal Sonelal candidate Rajkumar Pal.

2017
Sangam Lal Gupta won in last Assembly election of 2017 Uttar Pradesh Legislative Elections defeating Samajwadi Party candidate Nagrenda Singh by a margin of 34,554 votes.

References

External links
 

Assembly constituencies of Uttar Pradesh
Pratapgarh, Uttar Pradesh